Football Manager is a video game series published and developed by Addictive Games, the label set up by the game's creator Kevin Toms. The first game was released in 1982. It was then ported to most home computers during the 1980s and spawned several sequels: Football Manager 2 (1988) and Football Manager World Cup Edition (1990), both designed by Kevin Toms, and finally Football Manager 3 (1992), without Toms' involvement. Football Manager 3 sold poorly, and as a result the series came to an end. The series was claimed to have sold over a million copies by 1992 and close to two million copies overall. The game was to start a whole new genre of computer game, the football management simulation.

Football Manager

Toms developed the first game on a Video Genie, a clone of the Tandy TRS-80. This was a text only game. It was converted to the Sinclair ZX80 and ZX81, and Toms created the software label Addictive Games to launch the game in 1982. It was then ported to the ZX Spectrum with added animated graphics showing match highlights.

Football Manager 2

Following the sale of Addictive Games to Prism Leisure Corporation in 1987, Kevin Toms concentrated on creating a second Football Manager game. Unlike the original BASIC only game, the sequel required machine code which meant working with a number of developers for various systems. For the ZX Spectrum version, this was Bedrock Software. Unlike the first game that was stagger-released over a period of 5 years, Football Manager 2 was launched on all formats at the same time in June 1988, although it was available on a much smaller range of systems - Commodore 64, ZX Spectrum, Amstrad CPC, Amiga, Atari ST and PC.

Football Manager World Cup Edition

Development and release
Football Manager World Cup Edition was again designed by Kevin Toms with various programmers for different systems (including Bedrock Software for all 8-bit versions). A main figure in the management of the game was lost and not replaced and with the deadline of the World Cup dictating the release date, Toms felt the game was rushed and unfinished. This was the last involvement Toms had with either the series or Addictive Games.

The game was released in Summer 1990, to tie in with Italia '90, on all platforms Football Manager 2 had been as well as the MSX. The game was released in a 'big box' with World Cup wallchart and competitions including a chance to feature on the cover of the upcoming Football Manager 3 along with Kevin Toms (although this was never honoured as Toms had no involvement with that game).

Gameplay
Gameplay was radically changed from the previous two games. The player chooses a national team and must qualify for and then compete in the World Cup (although choosing champions Argentina or hosts Italy skips qualification). Player names can be entered at the start of the game ensuring they are correct.

Although there is no financial element or any transfers, the basic team management elements of the previous games are still retained. There is more detail in the team set up such as each player being given tactics. The highlights are again shown over 3 screens (although played from top to bottom rather than left to right) but there is also the option of watching from an overhead view of the whole pitch.

The main addition to the game is the ability to talk to your players in the dressing room and to the press. A graphical screen is shown and the player can choose from a set list of phrases to answer reporters' questions before a game and motivate the team in the dressing room at half time. This affects the team's morale which in turn affects their performance.

Reception
Your Sinclair gave a broadly positive review, particularly praising the new team talk and reporters' questions but questioned if it could win over new fans. It gave a score of 82% concluding "it's slick, well-programmed and it's got more depth than Marianas Trench [sic], but if you don't like management games you'll probably end up using the pictures of Kevin Toms to throw darts at." Spanish magazine MicroHobby gave the game a score of 60%. The Spectrum version of the game went to number 2 in the UK full price sales charts, behind Italy 1990.

Football Manager 3

Development and release
Football Manager 3, while already planned when Kevin Toms was still working with Prism Leisure on the World Cup Edition, was created without any involvement from the series' creator. Toms cited 'artistic differences' for the breakdown in the relationship between himself and Prism. The game was instead developed by Brian Rogers of Bedrock Software, who had actually been involved in programming the series since Football Manager 2.

Release of the game was delayed. While a playable demo of the ZX Spectrum version was included on the cover tape of the September 1991 issue of Your Sinclair, with an expected release date 'a couple of months' later, the game was finally released at the end of 1992. Also, though versions were planned and advertised for all of the platforms Football Manager 2 had been released on, the ST and Amiga versions were never released.

Gameplay
The game is completely redesigned and bears little resemblance to the previous installments. The game centres around a graphical screen of the manager's office with different parts of the game accessed by clicking on various items (e.g. the computer screen for results and fixtures, the picture of the team for training etc.). The game features a full 92 team league system (including the Charity Shield for the first time) and the teams begin the first season in the correct divisions (the 91/92 season for most versions, the 92/93 season including the newly formed Premier League in the C64 version) but the player's team, as in previous games, will always begin in the bottom division. The players, however, do not resemble real footballers and have random names (always shown with middle initials). The game always begins with a team of aging players with low skill ratings.

There is much more detail for individual player attributes with three endurance and five skill values that can be altered through training. Each player also has a face which is shown when picking the team. Player contracts have to be negotiated and out of contract players will leave the club. The transfer market is much improved with each team in the league having named players for the first time with histories that can be studied when deciding to buy a new player. The matches are shown side-on with the whole pitch on screen. They are also meant to represent the whole game rather than edited highlights. Text commentary is shown at the bottom of the screen as the match is played. Unlike the previous two games, there is no chance to change tactics or substitute at half time. The team talk and reporter elements are also removed in this version.

Reception
The game was not as well received as previous versions. Philip Lindey in Sinclair User suggested it was "difficult to get excited about Football Manager 3" and that it was overpriced, giving an overall score of 73%. Stuart Campbell in Your Sinclair thought the game was "not quite up to the standard of Football Manager 2, to be honest, with vastly inferior presentation and graphics, and lots of hanging around while the computer thinks and doesn't seem to be working properly", giving a score of 70%. Amstrad Action awarded the game only 38%, again claiming it did not live up to Football Manager 2.

Legacy
The Football Manager name was revived in 2004 by Sports Interactive as a continuation for their Championship Manager series after they lost the naming rights following a split with their publishers Eidos Interactive.

In August 2015, Toms began rewriting the original 1982 Football Manager game for mobile devices after pitching the idea to his followers, drawing on his work experience of business app development. The new game, Football Star* Manager (KTFSM), was released in 2016 to an overwhelmingly positive response from buyers – many of them former players of the original Football Manager series. KTFSM was first released on iOS and Android; since its release, the game has been ported to macOS, Windows 10 and Amazon Fire. The game is as near to the original Football Manager as you can get on the new platforms.

In January 2022, Kevin launched a Kickstarter to fund a new version of his Football Manager game, Football New Manager, to mark the 40th anniversary of the original game.

References

1990 video games
1992 video games
Amiga games
Amstrad CPC games
Association football management video games
Atari ST games
Commodore 64 games
DOS games
GP2X games
MSX games
Video games developed in the United Kingdom
Video game franchises introduced in 1982
ZX Spectrum games
Addictive Games games